Walter Schneiter (18 June 1918 – 18 December 1975) was a Swiss football forward who played for Switzerland in the 1950 FIFA World Cup. He also played for FC Zürich.

References

1918 births
1975 deaths
Swiss men's footballers
Switzerland international footballers
Association football forwards
FC Zürich players
1950 FIFA World Cup players